Sandfly/Buenavista is a ward in Central Province of Solomon Islands.

References 

Populated places in Central Province (Solomon Islands)